The Dreamcast is a video game console by Sega. While Sega found success in its Sega Genesis in the early 1990s, they experienced a series of commercial failures with their subsequent releases of Sega CD, 32X, and Sega Saturn, and hoped to reverse their fortunes with their release of the Dreamcast. However, the Dreamcast too featured a relatively short lifespan, launching across 1998 and 1999 in different regions, and being discontinued worldwide in March 2001. While the console had a moderately successful launch and opening year, momentum was slowed in the latter half of 2000, around the time of competitor Sony's launch of the PlayStation 2.

The platform specifically featured a large number of game cancellations when Sony's competing PlayStation 2 console launched in 2000, and then again in March 2001 upon the Dreamcast's discontinuation. This list documents all known games that were confirmed for the Dreamcast at some point, but did not end up being released for it.



Games

References

Cancelled Dreamcast games
Dreamcast
Dreamcast